Tranny is an offensive and derogatory slur for a transgender individual. 

During the early 2000s, there was some confusion and debate over whether the term was a pejorative, was considered acceptable, or a reappropriated term of unity and pride, but by 2017, the word had been banned by several major media stylebooks and was considered hate speech by Facebook.

Usage
Roz Kaveney wrote in The Guardian in 2010 that tranny had recently appeared to be undergoing reappropriation to be used with pride by trans activists, but "it didn't take", due in part to the word's continued use as a term of abuse. After using the slur in 2011, Lance Bass said he had thought the term was not a slur after having heard it used on RuPaul's Drag Race or Project Runway, but he apologized for using the slur after learning that it was not acceptable. GLAAD's 2011 Transgender Resource Page said the term is "usually considered offensive and/or defamatory to transgender people".

Justin Vivian Bond and Kate Bornstein have historically advocated for use of the term, with Bond saying in 2014 that banning the word does not eliminate transphobia but rather "steal[s] a joyous and hard-won identity from those of us who are and have been perfectly comfortable, if not delighted to be trannies."  Bornstein claimed the word was used in the 1960s and 1970s in Sydney, Australia by trans people as "a name for the identity they shared", but said no one should think Bornstein was giving them permission to use the slur to describe anyone without first knowing the term they used for their gender identity. In Tranny: An Evidence-Based Review, Cristin Williams reviewed historic use of the slur and found the first published instance in 1983, originating among gay men. Williams expressed doubt that the word originated long before then.

In 2014, the Tranny Awards changed its name to the Transgender Erotica Awards, citing feedback from the "extended trans adult community" as a reason to stop using the term. In 2017, Facebook's anti-hate speech algorithms started blocking posts containing tranny, as well as the slur for lesbians dyke and the slur for homosexual men fag.

References

External links 

Transgender culture
Cross-dressing culture
LGBT-related slurs
Pornography terminology
English words
English profanity
Transphobia